Norway competed at the 2004 Summer Olympics in Athens, Greece, from 13 to 29 August 2004. This was the nation's twenty-fourth appearance at the Summer Olympics, except for the 1904 Summer Olympics in St. Louis, and the 1980 Summer Olympics in Moscow, due to the country's support of the United States boycott. With the absence of women's football and handball teams, Norwegian Olympic and Paralympic Committee and Confederation of Sports sent the nation's smallest delegation to the Games since the 1968 Summer Olympics in Mexico City. A total of 53 athletes, 36 men and 17 women, competed only in 12 different sports. There was only a single competitor in badminton, swimming, taekwondo, weightlifting, and wrestling.

Sixteen athletes from the Norwegian team had previously competed in Sydney, including Olympic silver medalists Kjersti Plätzer in women's race walk and Olaf Tufte in men's single sculls. At age 51, rifle shooting veteran Harald Stenvaag became the second Norwegian in Summer Olympic history to participate in six Games, tying a record set by sailor Magnus Konow. He was appointed by the National Olympic Committee to carry the Norwegian flag in the opening ceremony. Other notable Norwegian athletes featured kayak pair and world champions Nils Olav Fjeldheim and Eirik Verås Larsen, yachting siblings Christoffer and Siren Sundby, and breaststroke swimmer Alexander Dale Oen, the youngest of the team at age 19.

Despite fielding its smallest team since 1968, Norway left Athens with a remarkable tally of six medals, five golds and one bronze. As a result, the Games were considered the nation's most successful Summer Olympics since 1920.

Medalists

Athletics

Norwegian athletes have so far achieved qualifying standards in the following athletics events (up to a maximum of 3 athletes in each event at the 'A' Standard, and 1 at the 'B' Standard).

Men
Track & road events

Field events

Combined events – Decathlon

Women
Track & road events

Badminton

Canoeing

Sprint

Qualification Legend: Q = Qualify to final; q = Qualify to semifinal

Cycling

Road
Men

Women

Mountain biking

Rowing

Norwegian rowers qualified the following boats:

Men

Qualification Legend: FA=Final A (medal); FB=Final B (non-medal); FC=Final C (non-medal); FD=Final D (non-medal); FE=Final E (non-medal); FF=Final F (non-medal); SA/B=Semifinals A/B; SC/D=Semifinals C/D; SE/F=Semifinals E/F; R=Repechage

Sailing

Norwegian sailors have qualified one boat for each of the following events.

Women

Open

M = Medal race; OCS = On course side of the starting line; DSQ = Disqualified; DNF = Did not finish; DNS= Did not start; RDG = Redress given

Shooting 

Five Norwegian shooters qualified to compete in the following events:

Men

Swimming

Norwegian swimmers earned qualifying standards in the following events (up to a maximum of 2 swimmers in each event at the A-standard time, and 1 at the B-standard time):

Men

Taekwondo

Norway has qualified a single taekwondo jin.

Volleyball

Beach

Weightlifting

Norway has qualified a single weightlifter.

Wrestling 

Men's Greco-Roman

See also
 Norway at the 2004 Summer Paralympics

References

External links
Official Report of the XXVIII Olympiad
Norwegian Olympic Committee and Confederation of Sports 

Nations at the 2004 Summer Olympics
2004
2004 in Norwegian sport